The men's 10,000 metres event at the 2009 Asian Athletics Championships was held at the Guangdong Olympic Stadium on November 14.

Results

References
Final results

2009 Asian Athletics Championships
10,000 metres at the Asian Athletics Championships